Žydrūnas Urbonas (born 4 October 1976, in Zarasai, Lithuanian Soviet Socialist Republic, USSR) is a former Lithuanian professional basketball player, who is the current head coach of Juventus Utena.

Playing career
Urbonas made his professional debut in the 1993–94 season and continued to play for various teams in the Lithuanian Basketball League for another eight years, playing for BC Lietkabelis, BC Lavera, being one of the team leaders there, before signing with BC Šiauliai, where he reached his biggest success, helping the team finish in 3rd place in 2000 and 2001, and becoming the LKL MVP in the 2001 season. In 2001, he moved to Metallurg Magnitogorsk of the Russian Basketball Super League 1, however, after the season he returned to BC Šiauliai and spent the 2002–03 season there before signing with AGE Chalkida of the Greek A2 Basket League for a brief time in 2003, though he returned to BC Šiauliai again to finish the 2003-2004 season and played a full 2004–05 season. He helped the team to win 3rd place in the LKL in 2004, and helped them win the LKL, BBL and FIBA Euro Cup Conference North 3rd places. In the 2005–06 season Urbonas signed with Barons Riga of the Latvian Basketball League and then moved to AEL Limassol of the Cyprus Basketball Division A for the 2006–07 season. Urbonas returned to Lithuania in 2007 and played there until autumn 2008 before signing with Donetsk of the Ukrainian Basketball SuperLeague for the 2008–2009 season. He finished his career playing for Juventus Utena from 2009 to 2012.

Coaching career
In 2009, Urbonas became a player-coach and the team's president when he joined Juventus Utena, and then became the assistant coach when he retired in 2012. He served as head coach under Rytis Vaišvila, Vitoldas Masalskis, Virginijus Sirvydis and Antanas Sireika, who coached and mentored him back during his playing days in BC Šiauliai.  He was still assistant coach, this time under Gediminas Petrauskas, in the 2017-2018 season, but became head coach by October, after Petrauskas resigned due to poor results.

National team career
Urbonas won a gold medal with the Lithuanian under-18 national team in 1994 FIBA Europe Under-18 Championship.

Career statistics

|-
| align="left" | 2008–09
| align="left" | Donetsk
| 10 ||  || 21.37 || .35 || .25 || .7 || 4.5 || 1.00 || 0.7 || .0 || 7.2

References

1976 births
Living people
AEL Limassol B.C. players
BC Juventus players
BC Lietkabelis players
Lithuanian expatriate basketball people
Lithuanian expatriate basketball people in Greece
Lithuanian expatriate basketball people in Russia
Lithuanian expatriate basketball people in Ukraine
Lithuanian expatriate sportspeople in Cyprus
Lithuanian expatriate sportspeople in Latvia
Lithuanian men's basketball players
People from Zarasai
Small forwards